The sixth season of Family Guy first aired on Fox from September 23, 2007, to May 4, 2008. The season includes 12 episodes and was shortened due to creator Seth MacFarlane's participation in the 2007–2008 Writers Guild of America strike, which resulted in Fox airing episodes without MacFarlane doing the final work. The episode "Lois Kills Stewie" was the last episode completed before the strike. When the strike ended in February 2008, Fox had already aired three episodes without any input from MacFarlane.

Episodes 2–8 of the sixth season are included on the Volume 6 DVD, which was released on October 21, 2008, and episodes 9–12 are included on the Volume 7 DVD, which was released on June 16, 2009. The season aired in the UK from May 4, 2008 – June 15, 2008 on BBC Three.

The executive producers for the sixth production season are Seth MacFarlane, David A. Goodman, Chris Sheridan and Danny Smith. Despite this being the show's sixth television season, only four episodes from the sixth production season were aired as part of it, with the remainder being held off for seasons seven and eight as a result of the WGA strike. Goodman and Sheridan continued to serve as showrunners.

Production
In November 2007, Variety reported that creator Seth MacFarlane had joined the 2007–2008 Writers Guild of America strike and refused to complete more Family Guy episodes. A spokesperson for Fox said: "Our hope is that he returns to work and completes his non-writing obligations on those episodes". IGN reported that Fox would air three episodes of Family Guy without MacFarlane doing the final work. MacFarlane noted that Fox could legally do that, but thought it was a "colossal dick move", and said that "They've never done anything like this before [...] It's really going to be unfortunate and damaging to our relationship if they do it."

Fox aired two new episodes during November 2007. The production of the episodes started but was not completed before the strike. "Padre de Familia" was the first episode of these two episodes to air and "Peter's Daughter" was the second. The strike ended on February 12, 2008 and the series resumed airing regularly.

Episodes

See also

References

External links

 
Family Guy seasons
2007 American television seasons
2008 American television seasons